The Fire that Consumes is an English translation of the 1955 play by French dramatist Henry de Montherlant,  La Ville dont le Prince est un enfant. The play was translated by Vivian Cox with Bernard Miles, and staged at the London West End Mermaid Theatre in 1977 with Nigel Hawthorne and Dai Bradley in the key roles. The title, literally translated, The City Whose Prince is a Child, is taken from Ecclesiastes 10:16: "Woe to thee, O land, when thy king is a child, and thy princes eat in the morning!"

Summary
The Abbé de Pradts, a Roman Catholic priest, becomes obsessed with a junior pupil named Souplier. When Souplier forms a relationship with a fellow student, the jealous priest vies for his attention, yielding tragic results.

Awards and nominations 
Awards
 1977 Laurence Olivier Award for Best New Play
 1977 Society of West End Theatre Award for Play of the Year

References

Further reading

External links
 

Plays by Henry de Montherlant
LGBT-related plays
Laurence Olivier Award-winning plays
West End plays
1977 plays

fr:La Ville dont le prince est un enfant